The 9th New York State Legislature, consisting of the New York State Senate and the New York State Assembly, met from January 12 to May 5, 1786, during the ninth year of George Clinton's governorship, at the Old Royal Exchange in New York City.

Background
Under the provisions of the New York Constitution of 1777, the State Senators were elected on general tickets in the senatorial districts, and were then divided into four classes. Six senators each drew lots for a term of 1, 2, 3 or 4 years and, beginning at the election in April 1778, every year six Senate seats came up for election to a four-year term. Assemblymen were elected countywide on general tickets to a one-year term, the whole assembly being renewed annually.

The 8th New York State Legislature adjourned on April 27, 1785. At this time, the Senate voted that the next Legislature meet at Kingston, New York on a day set by the governor. The Assembly voted to meet at a time and place to be determined by the governor, to which the Senate then agreed. On November 16, 1785, Governor Clinton called the Legislature to meet on January 6, 1786, at the Exchange in New York City.

Elections
The State election was held from April 26 to 28, 1785. Senator John Haring (Middle D.) was re-elected; and Thomas Tredwell (Southern D.), Volkert P. Douw, Philip Schuyler (both Western D.), and Assemblymen David Hopkins (Eastern D.) and Cornelius Humfrey (Middle D.), were elected to the Senate.

Sessions
The State Legislature met at the Old Royal Exchange in New York City, the Assembly on January 12, the Senate on January 16, 1786; and both Houses adjourned on May 5.

When the Legislature eventually had assembled a quorum, Governor Clinton told them that, following the principle of Separation of Powers, the Governor could call the Legislature only for special sessions, but the Legislature should henceforth decide for themselves where and when to meet for the next ordinary session, and suggested to pass a law for this purpose. On March 13, 1786, the Legislature enacted that future Legislatures meet on the first Tuesday of January of each year unless called earlier by the governor. However, no general meeting place was determined, leaving it for the time being to each Legislature to name the place where to reconvene, and if no place could be agreed upon, the Legislature should meet again where it adjourned.

State Senate

Districts
The Southern District (9 seats) consisted of Kings, New York, Queens, Richmond, Suffolk and Westchester counties.
The Middle District (6 seats) consisted of Dutchess, Orange and Ulster counties.
The Eastern District (3 seats) consisted of Washington, Cumberland and Gloucester counties.
The Western District (6 seats) consisted of Albany and Montgomery counties.

Note: There are now 62 counties in the State of New York. The counties which are not mentioned in this list had not yet been established, or sufficiently organized, the area being included in one or more of the abovementioned counties.

Members
The asterisk (*) denotes members of the previous Legislature who continued in office as members of this Legislature. Cornelius Humfrey and David Hopkins changed from the Assembly to the Senate.

Employees
Clerk: Abraham B. Bancker

State Assembly

Districts
The City and County of Albany (10 seats)
Cumberland County (3 seats)
Dutchess County (7 seats)
Gloucester County (2 seats)
Kings County (2 seats)
Montgomery County) (6 seats)
The City and County of New York (9 seats)
Orange County (4 seats)
Queens County (4 seats)
Richmond County (2 seats)
Suffolk County (5 seats)
Ulster County (6 seats)
Washington County (4 seats)
Westchester County (6 seats)

Note: There are now 62 counties in the State of New York. The counties which are not mentioned in this list had not yet been established, or sufficiently organized, the area being included in one or more of the abovementioned counties.

Assemblymen
The asterisk (*) denotes members of the previous Legislature who continued as members of this Legislature.

Employees
Clerk: John McKesson

Notes

Sources
The New York Civil List compiled by Franklin Benjamin Hough (Weed, Parsons and Co., 1858) [see pg. 108 for Senate districts; pg. 113 for senators; pg. 148f for Assembly districts; pg. 162f for assemblymen]

1785 in New York (state)
1786 in New York (state)
009